The Fresno Flames were a professional basketball franchise based in Fresno, California in 1988. The team played one season in the World Basketball League before folding in March 1989.  The WBL was a league for players 6' 4" tall and under.

Scott Brooks got his start with the Flames as an undrafted free agent out of the University of California-Irvine.  He later played 10 years in the NBA and later became a Head Coach in the NBA, winning Coach-of-the-Year honors with the Oklahoma City Thunder in 2010.

The Flames played its home games at the Selland Arena.

Sources
http://www.apbr.org/wbl88-92.html

World Basketball League teams
Defunct basketball teams in California